Jean David Ichbiah (25 March 1940 – 26 January 2007) was a French computer scientist and the initial chief designer (1977–1983) of Ada, a general-purpose, strongly typed programming language with certified validated compilers.

Early life
Ichbiah was a descendant of Greek and Turkish Jews from Thessaloniki who emigrated to France.

Career
From 1972 to 1974, he worked on designing an experimental system implementation language called LIS, based on Pascal and Simula. (He had been chairman of the Simula User's Group.) He was also one of the founding members of IFIP WG 2.4 on Systems Implementation Languages.

He then joined CII Honeywell Bull (CII-HB) in Louveciennes, France, becoming a member of the Programming Research division.

Ichbiah's team submitted a language design labelled "Green" to a competition to choose the United States Department of Defense's embedded programming language. When Green was selected in 1978, he continued as chief designer of the language, now named "Ada". In 1980, Ichbiah left CII-HB and founded the Alsys corporation in La Celle-Saint-Cloud, which continued language definition to standardize Ada 83, and later went into the Ada compiler business, also supplying special validated compiler systems to NASA, the US Army, and others. He later moved to the Waltham, Massachusetts subsidiary of Alsys.

In the 1990s, Ichbiah designed the keyboard layout FITALY, which is specifically optimized for stylus or touch-based input. Subsequently, he started the Textware Solutions company, which sells text entry software for PDAs and tablet PCs, as well as text-entry software for medical transcription on PCs.

Awards and honors
In 1979, Jean Ichbiah was designated a chevalier (knight) of the French Legion of Honour and a correspondent of the French Academy of Sciences. He received a Certificate of Distinguished Service from the United States Department of Defense for his work on Ada.

Death
Jean Ichbiah died from complications of a brain tumor on January 26, 2007.

References

Further reading

External links
Jean Ichbiah (1940-2007), press release by the Ada Resource Association
"Programming pioneer dies — A tribute to Ada's Jean Ichbiah", by Phil Manchester (2007-02-02)
Obituary by Bertrand Meyer, as published in SIGSOFT Software Engineering Notes
Jean Ichbiah, 66; designed landmark computer language (Boston Globe)
Ada inventor Jean Ichbiah dies (Computerworld)
Member of the French Academy of Sciences 
Ada 83 designer Jean Ichbiah dies, Ada User's Journal, Ada-Europe 2007

Ada (programming language)
American computer scientists
Chevaliers of the Légion d'honneur
Neurological disease deaths in Massachusetts
Deaths from cancer in Massachusetts
Deaths from brain cancer in the United States
French computer scientists
20th-century French Sephardi Jews
Members of the French Academy of Sciences
Programming language designers
Programming language researchers
1940 births
2007 deaths